Simone Zanotti (born December 31, 1992) is an Italian basketball player who plays for Napoli Basket of the Lega Basket Serie A.

Professional career 
After playing in the youth team of Pallacanestro Reggiana, Zanotti played for Ruvo di Puglia in 2011-12 and later for Lucca and Bisceglie.

After playing with Monteroni, in the 2016-17 year and in Porto Sant'Elpidio, in 2017-2018, Zanotti makes his debut in Serie A with the Victoria Libertas Pesaro in the 2018-19 season when he signs with the team he will remain for four seasons with, conquering, over the years, the season'sCoppa Italia finals and the qualifications for the playoffs in the 2020-21 season. 

On July 1, 2022 he signed with Napoli Basket. He made his debut on October 2, 2022 when he scored 2 points and got 5 rebounds in 11 minutes in a loss against Virtus Bologna.

National team career 
He played four games as a player of the Italy's national basketball team. He made every appearance in the EuroBasket 2022 qualifications.

References

External links 

 Simone Zanotti, on Legabasket.it, Lega Basket.
 Simone Zanotti, on Basketball-reference.com, Sports Reference LLC.
 Simone Zanotti, on eurobasket.com, Eurobasket Inc.
 Simone Zanotti, on realgm.com, RealGM LLC.
 Simone Zanotti, on LegaPallacanestro.com, Lega Nazionale Pallacanestro.

Napoli Basket players
Pallacanestro Reggiana players
Living people
Italian sportspeople
Victoria Libertas Pallacanestro players
Power forwards (basketball)
1992 births
Sportspeople from Turin